Waihuanlu, literally Outer Ring Road, is a station on Line 1 of the Shanghai Metro. This station is part of the southern extension of that line that opened on 28 December 1996, and is located near the crossing of two major elevated highways. This makes the station often used by travelers to and from the southern outskirts of the city.

References

Railway stations in China opened in 1996
Shanghai Metro stations in Minhang District
Line 1, Shanghai Metro
Railway stations in Shanghai